HD 32453 (HR 1631) is a solitary star located in the southern constellation Caelum. With an apparent magnitude of 6.01, it's barely visible to the naked eye under ideal conditions. This star is located 407 light years away based on its parallax shift, but is drifting away at a rate of 5.73 km/s.

HD 32453 has a classification of G8 III, which states it's an evolved G-type star that exhausted hydrogen at its core and left the main sequence. At present it has 2.40 times the Sun's mass, but at an age of 700 million years, HD 32453 has expanded to 10 times the latter's girth (radius detected from an angular diameter of 0.748 mas). It radiates at 50 solar luminosities from its enlarged photosphere at an effective temperature of 5,032 K, which gives it a yellow hue. HD 32453 is slightly metal deficient, and spins slowly with a projected rotational velocity of 2 km/s, common for a giant star.

References

G-type giants
Caelum
Durchmusterung objects
Caeli, 25
032453
1631
023377